Veurne/Sint-Augustinus Heliport  is a hospital heliport located near Veurne, West Flanders, Belgium.

See also
List of airports in Belgium

References

External links 
 Airport record for Veurne/Sint-Augustinus Heliport at Landings.com

Airports in West Flanders